Forbordsfjellet is a mountain in the municipality of Stjørdal in Trøndelag county, Norway. There is a toll road to the summit from European route E6 near Skatval Church.

Forbordsfjellet is also used for paragliding. Fram IL organizes a 4.8 km long backhill race that starts at Skatval church and has a finish at the top of the mountain. Many tourists and residents come to the top to look at the views of Nedre Stjørdalen, Åsenfjorden and towards Trondheim.

The name comes from the Forbord hamlet located west of the mountain, and the name Forbord supposedly means "at the foot of the mountain". Thus, the name Forbordsfjellet can, oddly enough, be translated into "at the foot of the mountain-mountain". The solution to this logical problem may be that the hamlet at the foot of the mountain may have been named Forbord first, but when the locals forgot the name of the name, the mountain was given the name Forbordsfjellet. There are no other known names on the mountain.

A popular destination for hiking is Svartkamhytta.

References

Stjørdal
Mountains of Trøndelag